Jacques Bourdin, seigneur de Villeines (died 6 July 1567) was a French Minister of Finances, 14 June 1549.

He was the son that was also Jacques Bourdin (d. 9 April 1534).  His sister was Isabeau Boudin and Gilles Bourdin (1515 in Paris-23 January 1570)  He married Catherine Brianson (d. 1579).

He became seigneur de Villaines in 1554 after the death of Jean Brinon.

References

French Foreign Ministers
1567 deaths
1510 births
16th-century French diplomats
16th-century French politicians
Court of Henry II of France